Rocky Hock is an unincorporated community in Chowan County, North Carolina, United States.  Its elevation is 26 feet (8 m).  Faced with three different possible official names for the community, the Board on Geographic Names officially proclaimed it Rockyhock in 1982.

References

Unincorporated communities in Chowan County, North Carolina
Unincorporated communities in North Carolina